Funeral Procession is a painting by Clementine Hunter. It is in the collection of the Savannah College of Art and Design in Savannah, Georgia. Funeral Procession is one of many in a series of funeral procession-themed paintings by Hunter.

Description
The painting depicts an African American funeral procession in Louisiana. Two men leave a church carrying a coffin decorated in flowers. A woman follows behind, holding flowers. The coffin is being carried to a freshly dug grave in the foreground, where two religious figures hold crosses over the grave. Four female figures with flowers and two male figures wait at the graveside.

History
Funeral Procession was painted around 1950 by Hunter. In 2013, the piece was included in the Savannah College of Art and Design's exhibit,“Rehearsals: The Practice and Influence of Sound and Movement," for the painting's connection to the African American tradition of musical celebrations for the dead.

References

1950s paintings
Paintings by Clementine Hunter